The Cebu warty pig (Sus cebifrons cebifrons) previously lived in Cebu, Philippines before becoming extinct in modern times, primarily due to habitat destruction. This pig was assessed to be extinct in 2000.

The main species, Sus cebifrons, the Visayan warty pig, still found in the Philippines, is itself facing extinction.

References
IUCN Red List

Suidae
Fauna of Cebu
Extinct mammals of Asia
Species made extinct by human activities
Mammal extinctions since 1500
Mammals of the Philippines
Endemic fauna of the Philippines